Flitcham is a village and civil parish in the English county of Norfolk. Together with the villages of West Newton, Shernborne and Anmer, Flitcham forms part of the Royal Sandringham Estate.

History
Flitcham's name is of Anglo-Saxon origin and derives from the Old English for a village or settlement where 'flitches' of Bacon were produced.

In 1948, the site of a Roman villa was excavated close to Denbeck Wood, within the parish. After excavation, the villa was found to have glazed windows, a tessellated floor and a small courtyard flanker by other buildings from the same period. Further artefacts, including coins, pottery and metalwork dating from the Third and Forth Centuries, have been discovered close to the site and across the parish. Another possible Roman building has been identified close to the course of the River Babingley. In addition, the Denbeck Wood excavations also led to the discovery of several Anglo-Saxon artefacts including brooches, pottery and several fittings. 

In the Domesday Book, Flitcham is listed as a settlement of 88 households in the hundred of Freebridge. In 1086, the village was divided between the East Anglian estates of Bishop Odo de Bayeux, William de Warenne and Roger Bigod. The survey lists the value of Flitcham as  4 mills, a church,  of meadow, pannage for 27 swine, 3 cows, 1 beast for carriage and 180 sheep. In the Domesday Book, the size of woodland was normally given as the number of swine a wood

Appleton Hall was built within the parish in the late-Sixteenth Century by Sir Edward Paston and was subsequently destroyed by fire in the early Eighteenth Century.

During the First World War, many local men joined the 1/5th Battalion of the Royal Norfolk Regiment. In 1915, the unit was sent to Gallipoli and first saw action at Suvla Bay, on the 21 August the unit attacked the Ottoman positions and subsequently found themselves encircled and then eliminated. Six Flitcham men were killed on the 21st August 1915 in this attack. These events were dramatised in All the King's Men starring David Jason.

Appleton House was built in the 1860s as a residence for Haakon VII of Norway and his wife, Maud of Wales, during visits to England, with the future Olav V being born in the house. During the Second World War, Appleton House was the residence of the Norwegian monarchy in exile and to this effect a sophisticated air-raid shelter was attached to the house.

Today, the parish also includes the deserted settlement of Appleton.

Geography
According to the 2011 Census, Flitcham with Appleton has a population of 276 residents living in 131 households.

Flitcham falls within the constituency of North West Norfolk and is represented at Parliament by James Wild MP of the Conservative Party. For the purposes of local government, the parish falls within the district of King's Lynn and West Norfolk.

The eastern boundary of the parish is discernible by Peddars Way, a long-distance footpath between Knettishall and Holme-next-the-Sea.

St. Mary's Church
Flitcham's parish church is today ruined, with the chancel collapsed and the tower remaining. The ruined church dates from the Twelfth Century and was restored in the Nineteenth Century, the font remains in the church and was moved to Flitcham in the 1880s from Sandringham by King Edward VII.

Notable Residents
 Sir Edward Paston (1550-1630)- English landowner and amateur musician
 Maud of Wales (1869-1938)- Queen of Norway between 1869 and 1938
 King Haakon VII (1872-1957)- King of Norway between 1905 and 1957
 King Olav V (1903-1991)- King of Norway between 1957 and 1991

War Memorial
Flitcham's war memorial takes the form of stone obelisk atop a square plinth adorned with slate on each face and stands along the side of the B1153. The memorial lists the following names for the First World War:

 L-Cpl. William Mickelborough (1882-1916), 8th Bn., Border Regiment
 L-Cpl. William C. Grimes (d.1915), 1/5th Bn., Royal Norfolk Regiment
 L-Cpl. Charles Hunter (1894-1915), 1/5th Bn., Royal Norfolk Regt.
 L-Cpl. George H. Williamson (1883-1915), 7th Bn., Royal Norfolk Regt.
 Dvr. William J. Smith (1883-1915), 2nd (Depot) Coy., Royal Army Service Corps
 Pvt. Allan Bridges (1881-1917), 2nd Bn., Bedfordshire Regiment
 Pvt. Ernest Rix (d.1918), 2nd Bn., Bedfordshire Regt.
 Pvt. Sidney Rayner (1885-1918), 9th Bn., East Surrey Regiment
 Pvt. Frederick Bridges (d.1917), 1st Bn., Essex Regiment
 Pvt. William Rudley (1894-1915), 1st Bn., Essex Regt.
 Pvt. George H. Seaman (1883-1914), 1st Bn., Royal Norfolk Regiment
 Pvt. Arthur Bridges (1890-1915), 1/5th Bn., Royal Norfolk Regt.
 Pvt. Leonard A. Bridges (d.1915), 1/5th Bn., Royal Norfolk Regt.
 Pvt. Charles E. Grimes (d.1915), 1/5th Bn., Royal Norfolk Regt.
 Pvt. Thomas Grimes (d.1917), 1/5th Bn., Royal Norfolk Regt.
 Pvt. William J. Humphrey (d.1915), 1/5th Bn., Royal Norfolk Regt.
 Pvt. Walter W. Mindham (d.1917), 1/5th Bn., Royal Norfolk Regt.
 Pvt. Robert J. Overman (1893-1917), 1/5th Bn., Royal Norfolk Regt.
 Pvt. Arthur R. Beckett (1895-1916), 7th Bn., Royal Norfolk Regt.
 Pvt. Henry E. Broadwater (1895-1918), 1st Bn., Queen's Royal Regiment
 G. H. Bird
 E. Burger
 L. T. H. Waites
 P. F. Williamson

And, the following for the Second World War:
 Pvt. Joseph D. Searle (1919-1942), 5th Bn., Bedfordshire and Hertfordshire Regiment
 Pvt. Percy W. Bix (1918-1940), 7th Bn., Royal Norfolk Regiment

External links

 Village web site

References

Villages in Norfolk
King's Lynn and West Norfolk